The following countries operate or have operated submarines for naval or other military purposes.

Countries with currently operational submarines

 Algeria
 Australia
 Azerbaijan
 Bangladesh
 Brazil
 Canada
 Chile
 Colombia
 Cuba - One indigenous design submarine was reported in service in 2020.
 Ecuador
 Egypt
 France (list)
 Germany (list)
 Greece
 India (list)
 Indonesia
 Iran
 Italy (list)
 Israel
 Japan
 Malaysia
 Myanmar
 Netherlands (list)
 North Korea
 Norway
 Pakistan
 People's Republic of China
 Republic of China (Taiwan)
 Peru
 Poland
 Portugal (list)
 Russia (list) (some ex-Soviet Union)
 Singapore
 South Africa
 South Korea
 Spain (list)
 Sweden (list)
 Turkey (list)
 United Kingdom (list)
 United States (list)
 Venezuela
 Vietnam

Ballistic Missile Submarines (SSBN)

Ballistic missile submarines are larger than any other type of submarine, in order to accommodate ballistic missiles capable of carrying nuclear warheads.
 China – Type 094 submarine, Type 092 submarine
 France – 
 India – 
 North Korea (suspected) – Sinpo-class submarine
 Russia –  and es
 United Kingdom – 
 United States –

Countries previously operating submarines 
 Albania - all retired 1998
 Argentina - Two submarines inactive (non-operational) in the Argentinian Navy.
 Austria-Hungary (list)
 Bulgaria - all retired by 2011
 Cuba - Operated 3 s retired. 
 Denmark - retired after 2003
 Estonia (Kalev and ) - decommissioned 1955 in the Soviet Navy
 Finland - last subs decommissioned after World War II
 Latvia - all submarines taken over by Soviet Union in 1940.
 Libya - all Foxtrot-class submarines retired (1 non-commissioned remains docked)
 Romania (not operational; used for dockside training)
 Serbia and Montenegro (ex-Socialist Federal Republic of Yugoslavia) 
 Soviet Union (list) (prior to 1991 collapse, many now operated by successor state Russia)
 Syria - all s retired around 1992
 Thailand ( during the Franco-Thai War - built in Japan 1938 and retired 1951)
 Ukraine ( - lost to Russia in the 2014 Crimean crisis)

See also
 List of submarine classes

References

External links

 Jane's
 Submarine Warfare in the 20th & 21st Centuries:Bibliography
 World Navies Today

Operators
Submarine operators